Blachford Lake is a remote lake in Northern Canada, near Yellowknife. The lake is located at 62 09.97'N, 112 40.96' W and is to the north of the start eastern arm of the Great Slave Lake. It is home of the Dechinta: Centre for Research and Learning, an on-the-land university, co-founded in part by Glen Coulthard, that teaches traditional northern skills.

Royal visit

The lake and Dechinta: Centre for Research and Learning was visited by Prince William, Duke of Cambridge and Catherine, Duchess of Cambridge on their 2011 tour of Canada; during the visit they were taken to an uninhabited island where they were prepared supper by a local cook.

References

Lakes of the Northwest Territories